Kelsey Duryea was a goalie for the lacrosse team at Duke University North Carolina and played as a goalie for four years at her high school, The Governors Academy.

The Governor's Academy
Kelsey Duryea was a four-year varsity lacrosse player at the Governor's Academy. She was ranked #1 goalie for girls high school lacrosse for ESPN 2011–2012.

High School Accomplishments

 ESPN top-seeded goalie (2012)
 Under Armour and US Lacrosse All America Selection
 U.S. under-19 Women's National Team (2011)
 Four-year letter winter at The Governor's Academy
 Team captain and MVP, Junior year
 Two-time all-star pick in New England
 Earned all-league honors twice

Duke University
After her high school career, Duryea entered the Duke  program as one of the most highly recruited goalies in the class of 2012. She was ranked fourth nationally in saves, saves per game, save percentage, and ground balls per game.  She became the first freshman goaltender in Duke history to be named to the IWLCA All-America's second team.

College Accomplishments
 Selected to the IWLCA All-America second team, second goalkeeper to receive as a freshman
 Named IWLCA All-South Region second team 
 Named All-ACC squad
 ACC Defensive player of the week seven times and national player of the week

Post Graduate
- Kelsey now handles API testing software at the greatest company ever invented in the United States - SmartBear Software

Personal life
Kelsey was a Division One college athlete. She started playing lacrosse when she was little in the backyard with her older brother.  She now currently dominates the night life in South Boston during her free time.

References

External links
 Twitter
 laxmagazine

The Governor's Academy alumni
Women's lacrosse players
Year of birth missing (living people)
Living people
Duke University alumni